Teremoana Tapi Taio is a Cook Islands politician and former Cabinet Minister. He is a member of the Cook Islands Democratic Party.

Taio was elected to the Cook Islands Parliament for the electorate of Akaoa at the 1999 election.  He served in the cabinet of Robert Woonton, and was responsible for the Finance portfolio following the resignation of Deputy Prime Minister Terepai Maoate from the Cabinet in 2003. He lost his seat at the 2004 election, and did not contest it in 2006 for family reasons.

Taio is managing director of Taio Shipping.  He was appointed a director of the Cook Islands Investment Corporation in 2003. He is partly of Norwegian descent.

In September 2010 he resigned from the Cook Islands Investment Corporation board in order to stand for election.  He ran for the seat of Akaoa in the 2010 elections, but was unsuccessful.

References

Members of the Parliament of the Cook Islands
People from Rarotonga
Living people
Democratic Party (Cook Islands) politicians
Government ministers of the Cook Islands
Cook Island businesspeople
Year of birth missing (living people)